John Inglis Drever "Don" Pottinger (1919–1986) was a Scottish officer of arms, artist, illustrator and author. He is remembered for the publication, with Sir Iain Moncreiffe, of Simple Heraldry, Cheerfully Illustrated (1953).

Early life
Pottinger was born at Carnoustie, Angus in 1919. He was the second son of Reverend William Pottinger, and younger brother of William George Pottinger, known as George. He himself was known as Don from childhood because he was unable to pronounce his given name properly. He was educated at the High School of Dundee and received a scholarship to the Edinburgh College of Art in 1937.

His plans were interrupted by the outbreak of World War II in 1939. He served in the British Army throughout North Africa and Italy and ended his service in Palestine in 1946. During the war, he took time off to marry Fay Keeling.

After he was demobilized, Pottinger returned to his art studies in Edinburgh. In 1947 he won the Chalmer's Prize from the Royal Scottish Academy, and received his Diploma in Drawing and Painting in 1948. He completed an MA in Fine Arts in 1951 at the University of Edinburgh.

Heraldic career
Pottinger's training led to a career in portrait painting, and he painted many of the most prominent people in Scotland during the 1950s. In 1949, he was commissioned to paint the official portrait of Lord Lyon King of Arms, Sir Thomas Innes of Learney.

During the sittings for the portrait, Pottinger was delighted by his conversations with Learney about the art of heraldry. This led to an appointment as a part-time herald painter at the Court of Lord Lyon King of Arms. Another result of this commission was Pottinger's meeting Sir Iain Moncreiffe of that Ilk and collaborating with him on the book Simple Heraldry, Cheerfully Illustrated (1953). This book was a best-seller and was reprinted three times in its first year. No small part of the success were Pottinger's "cheerful" illustrations.

In 1953 he was appointed as Linlithgow Pursuivant of Arms Extraordinary, as Unicorn Pursuivant of Arms in Ordinary in 1961 and Islay Herald of Arms in Ordinary in 1981. Also in 1981, he was appointed Lyon Clerk and Keeper of the Records at Lyon Court. Throughout his heraldic career, he continued to paint portraits and other works for a variety of clients.

In 1985, he was made an Honorary Senior Fellow of Renison University College, in Waterloo, Ontario, Canada, for his contributions to heraldry.

Pottinger remained Islay and Lyon Clerk until his death in 1986.

Personal life
Don and Fay Pottinger lived in the New Town, Edinburgh. He was a member of the New Club.

Pottinger's own arms

Published works

See also
Scottish Heraldry

References

Sources

External links
The Court of Lord Lyon

|-

|-

Scottish officers of arms
Scottish genealogists
British Army personnel of World War II
1919 births
1986 deaths
20th-century Scottish painters
Scottish male painters
People from Carnoustie
People educated at the High School of Dundee
Alumni of the Edinburgh College of Art
Alumni of the University of Edinburgh
20th-century British historians
Scottish portrait painters
Scottish illustrators
20th-century Scottish male artists